This is a detailed discography for American country pop artist Jim Reeves.

Albums

Singles

1950s

1960s

1970s and 1980s

Notes
A^ "Snowflake" also peaked at number 9 on the RPM Adult Contemporary Tracks chart in Canada.
B^ "Adios Amigo" also peaked at #23 in the UK.
C^ "He'll Have To Go" also made the US R&B charts at position #13.

References

External links
 Allmusic Jim Reeves with Discography and Charts

Country music discographies
Discographies of American artists